Constituent Assembly elections were held in Argentina on 5 December 1948. Peronistas dominated the election, winning 66% of the vote. Voter turnout was 74%.

Results

Results by province

References

Argentina
1948 in Argentina
Elections in Argentina
December 1948 events in South America